This article lists feature-length films and full-length documentaries that were at least partly produced by the Bangladeshi film industry and were released in Bangladesh in 2017. Short films and made-for-TV films are not included. Films are ordered by domestic public release date, excluding film festivals, theatrical releases abroad, and sneak previews or screenings.

Highest-grossing films

The top three films released in 2017 by gross collection are as follows:

Events

Releases

January–March

April–June

July–September

October–December

See also
 2017 in Bangladesh

References

2017 in Bangladesh
Bangladeshi
 2017